In archaeology a posthole or post-hole is a cut feature used to hold a surface timber or stone. They are usually much deeper than they are wide; however, truncation may not make this apparent. Although the remains of the timber may survive, most postholes are mainly recognisable as circular patches of darker earth when viewed in plan. Archaeologists can use their presence to plot the layout of former structures, as the holes may define its corners and sides. Construction using postholes is known as earthfast or post in ground construction.

Parts of a posthole
Although a very common structure, and one of the most basic found in archaeology, correct interpretation relies on being able to tell the often subtle differences that distinguish the parts of the posthole. The components of an archaeological posthole are listed in order of creation and, in ideal circumstances, the reverse order of their excavation.

Posthole cut
This is the cut that formed the hole. It is cut from the ground surface level at time of construction. The sides of the hole may be distorted by later pressure on the post (as in the left hand example of the image), or later disturbance. Only careful excavation will be able to distinguish between the original cut profile and any later distortion.

The cut needs to be distinguished from the fill in any detailed stratigraphic analysis, in the same way that any pit fill has to post-date the cutting of the pit, even if by minutes.

Dug up soil
Soil excavated from the hole, usually sitting in a pile next to the hole ready for backfilling. Ideal sequence will be that the dug up soil will have material dug through first at the bottom of the pile, with material from deeper down on top of the pile. In optimal situations, the location of dug up soil can be detected adjacent to filled postholes, especially where subsoil differs markedly from the surface material.

Post
Normally a round or squared timber placed in the hole. Sometimes a stone may be set in the hole below the post to prevent the post sinking in soft ground or sticks and stones to keep the post properly aligned until it is filled. Many cultures charred their posts to slow down rate of decay in situ. This is sometimes mistaken for burning in situ. Posts may, in modern times, be soaked in creosote or other decay inhibitors or termite preventatives.

The post may survive as an element or have decayed (a postpipe), or been removed. Even if decayed there should be a dark organic stain that matches the original dimensions and extent of the post.

Posthole fill / Post packing
The dug up soil goes back in the hole once the post is in place. Sometimes structural needs require that the hole is also packed with rocks or smaller sticks to keep the post in desired position. Ideally dug out material returns to the pit in its original stratigraphic order but inevitably mixing occurs so that ground layers and posthole layers are distinguishable. Logically not all of the contents of the hole will fit back once the post is emplaced, so remaining soil may be left in a pile or scattered.

Postpipe or post mould
The decayed buried section of the post that remains in situ. Some archaeologists prefer pipe where it is predominantly still organic material and mould where this has been replaced by sediment.

Post void
Where a pipe has been removed. This may be uncovered as a cavity, although this is rare and usually a combination of slumping of posthole fill and inwashed deposits fill the position of the post, which is usually termed post mould.

Posthole
This is the generic term for all of the archaeological evidence contained within the cut, particularly when seen in plan view, including any artefacts that have been introduced during the cutting and filling sequence.

Procedure for excavating a posthole
To excavate a posthole a series of steps must be taken. First, the postholes are sprayed with water to prevent them from drying out and to make the edges show up more clearly. The postholes then are measured to see where the widest point is (about halfway through). One half of the post hole and part of the surrounding soil is dug out in a rectangular shape until the bottom of the post hole is visible on the wall of the intact half. This wall is the profile wall of the post hole. The post hole is then measured of its width and height and the profile wall is drawn, with important features like rocks or bones being marked.

Interpretation of postholes
Postholes are different from stake holes in that the cut is dug for the post rather than created by the driving in of the stake. This means there is some voided space that has to be filled in once the post is in place. This material is post packing and is one of the main ways of differentiating postholes from stake holes in plan. The shape and structure of the contexts within a posthole can also shed light on past activity. If a post was purposely removed, then the action of rocking it back and forth leaves tell-tale evidence in the profile of the posthole which archaeologists can recognise. A post may have rotted in place leaving a postpipe or still be surviving (See the section in Fig 1). Archaeologists can use their presence to plot the layout of former structures as the holes may define its corners and sides. Postholes may also be dug on alignments of backfilled ditches where boundaries have been upgraded from simple ditch enclosures into structural ones.

Dangers of posthole interpretation
The relative frequency of postholes as a feature in most eras combined with a lack of good information on the phasing of postholes, which often occurs onsite due to horizontal truncation or a failure to spot postholes at the level they were cut from, can lead to a clutter of postholes that invites imaginative interpretations. The human mind seems quite capable of creating patterns and the temptation to see structures that are not there or tenuous at best is quite strong. It is considered good practice that supporting evidence from multiple sources on site like the perceived structures alignments with other features onsite should be taken into account before any hard interpretation is made as to whether postholes with no stratigraphic relationship to each other are truly associated.

See also
Archaeological section
Cut (archaeology)
Excavation (archaeology)
Feature (archaeology)
Fill (archaeology)
Postpipe

Archaeological features
Building